A suffragan diocese is one of the dioceses other than the metropolitan archdiocese that constitute an ecclesiastical province. It exists in some Christian denominations, in particular the Catholic Church, the Coptic Orthodox Church of Alexandria, and the Romanian Orthodox Church.

In the Catholic Church, although such a diocese is governed by its own bishop or ordinary, who is the suffragan bishop, the metropolitan archbishop has in its regard certain rights and duties of oversight. He has no power of governance within a suffragan diocese, but has some limited rights and duties to intervene in cases of neglect by the authorities of the diocese itself.

See also

 Suffragan bishop
 Suffragan Bishop in Europe (a title in the Church of England)
 List of Roman Catholic archdioceses (by country and continent)
 List of Roman Catholic dioceses (alphabetical) (including archdioceses)
 List of Roman Catholic dioceses (structured view) (including archdioceses)

References 

Christian terminology
Episcopacy in Eastern Orthodoxy
Episcopacy in Oriental Orthodoxy
Episcopacy in the Catholic Church